Beck – Annonsmannen (English: Beck – The Advertising Man) is a 2002 film about the Swedish police detective Martin Beck directed by Daniel Lind Lagerlöf.

Selected cast
 Peter Haber as Martin Beck
 Mikael Persbrandt as Gunvald Larsson
 Malin Birgerson as Alice Levander
 Marie Göranzon as Margareta Oberg
 Hanns Zischler as Josef Hillman
 Ingvar Hirdwall as Martin Beck's neighbour
 Mårten Klingberg as Nick
 Jimmy Endeley as Robban
 Peter Hüttner as Oljelund
 Rebecka Hemse as Inger (Martin Beck's daughter)
 Neil Bourguiba as Wilhelm (Inger's son)
 Andreas Kundler as Jesper Wennquist
 Eva Fritjofsson as Elin (Jesper's mother)
 Livia Millhagen as Malin Tavast
 Magnus Krepper as Bengt Tavast
 Angela Kovacs as Doctor
 Sten Elfström as Rune Fjällgård
 Tommy Andersson as Svanborg

References

External links

2000s Swedish-language films
Martin Beck films
2002 television films
2002 films
2000s crime films
Films directed by Daniel Lind Lagerlöf
2000s police procedural films
2000s Swedish films